The Fundamental Ordinance of 1882 was a constitution of the Khedivate of Egypt, an autonomous tributary state of the Ottoman Empire.  It followed an abortive attempt to promulgate a constitution in 1879.  The document was limited in scope and was effectively more of an organic law of the Consultative Council to the khedive than an actual constitution.

References

See also
History of the Egyptian Constitution
Egyptian Constitution of 1879 (abortive)
Egyptian Constitution of 1923
Egyptian Constitution of 1930
Egyptian Constitution of 1956
Provisional Constitution of the United Arab Republic of 1958
Egyptian Constitution of 1964 ("Constitution of the United Arab Republic", provisional)
Egyptian Constitution of 1971
Egyptian Constitutional Declaration of 2011 (provisional)
Egyptian Constitution of 2012
Egyptian Constitution of 2014

1882
Constitution of 1882
Constitution of 1882
Defunct constitutions
1882 documents